Hertfordshire Constabulary is the territorial police force responsible for policing the county of Hertfordshire in England. Its headquarters is in Welwyn Garden City. The current chief constable is Charlie Hall. As of March 2019, the force consists of over 1,900 police officers, 235 PCSOs, over 1500 police staff, as well as being supported by more than 410 special constables.

History
The constabulary was founded in 1841, under the County Police Act, five years after the Hertford Borough Police and St Albans Borough Police had been formed. In 1889, the Hertford Borough Police force was merged into Hertfordshire.

The first constables were working-class men and were paid at the level of an agricultural labourer. In Victorian times, officers were entitled to only one rest day in every four to six weeks and were entitled to only one week's unpaid annual leave a year. A ten-hour working day was the norm and no meal breaks were allowed.
There were strict constraints on an officer's private life too. For example, officers reportedly could not leave their homes without permission and could only go out with their wives so long as they were not absent for more than two hours and someone was home to take messages.

St Albans Constabulary remained independent until 1947, then being absorbed into the Hertfordshire Constabulary. Finally, it was in 2000 that the current force boundaries came into place with the addition of Hertsmere and Broxbourne, transferred from the Metropolitan Police.

In 2006, proposals were made by Charles Clarke, the then Home Secretary, that would see the force merge with neighbour forces Bedfordshire Police and Essex Police to form a new strategic police force. However, in July 2006, the then Prime Minister Tony Blair signalled that police force mergers would not be forced through by the central government.
However, with the economic recession beginning in 2008 the force began working on collaboration with neighbouring forces. First joining with Bedfordshire Police and then Cambridgeshire Constabulary in a strategic alliance, the three forces formed joint units in counter terrorism, major crime, dogs, firearms, SOCO, roads policing, operation planning, civil contingencies, ICT and professional standards. Working collaboratively in this way protected local policing by local officers, but enabled specialist units to work across, and be paid for by, all three forces.

Further collaborative work is underway with call handling, control and dispatch, human resources and some 'back-office' functions being examined for merging. For the foreseeable future, the Constabulary looks likely to remain an independent force. Ultimately, the decision for any full merger of the three forces will be in the hands of the Police and Crime Commissioners, and thereby in turn, the public themselves.

Chief constables
1841–1880 : Archibald Robertson
1880–1910 : H. Smith Daniell
1910–1928 : Alfred Letchworth Law
1928–1939 : George Thomas Knight
1939–1943 : Sydney Ewart Fairman
1943–1945 : Abel Camp
1945–1947 : Arthur Edwin Young
1947–1969 : Albert Frederick Wilcox
1969–1977 : Raymond N. Buxton
1977–1984 : Adrian Clissitt
1984–1990 : Trefor A. Morris
1990–1994 : Baden (Bill) Henry Skitt
1994–2000 : Peter S. Sharpe
2000–2004 : Paul Acres
2004–2011 : Frank Whiteley
2011–2016 : Andy Bliss
2016–present : Charlie Hall

Officers killed in the line of duty

The Police Roll of Honour Trust and Police Memorial Trust list and commemorate all British police officers killed in the line of duty. Since its establishment in 1984, the Police Memorial Trust has erected 50 memorials nationally to some of those officers. Since 1950, the following officers of Hertfordshire Constabulary are listed by the Trust as having been killed in the line of duty:

Organisation and structure

Local policing
Local policing is overseen by the Local Policing Command, headed by a chief superintendent. The county is sub-divided into ten divisions, also known as Community Safety Partnerships (CSP), which broadly correspond to the local Borough and Council areas. The ten CSPs, each headed by a chief inspector are: Watford, Three Rivers, Dacorum, Welwyn and Hatfield, St Albans, Hertsmere, East Herts, Broxbourne, Stevenage and North Herts. 
Each CSP has:
 Five Intervention and Response Teams: Each team is headed by a sergeant and aligned to a shift pattern, there is always at least one team on duty at any time during the year. Intervention teams respond to 999 and non emergency calls and perform general patrol duties.
 Safer Neighbourhood Teams: Combined teams of PCs and PCSOs covering local and quality of life issues. Each Ward/Neighbourhood has at least one PC and PCSO to maintain an up-to-date knowledge of local issues and to address them. Each town is headed by a sergeant, with an inspector supervising on a CSP level.
 Local Crime Unit: Team of Detectives with a remit covering burglaries to assaults, historically referred to as CID.

Specialist units

Local policing is supplemented by an array of specialist units, some of which are collaborated with Bedfordshire and Cambridgeshire. These include:
 Armed Policing Unit: Collaborated unit working across the three counties providing Armed Response Vehicles, crewed with authorised firearms officers to assist in the response to potentially dangerous incidents such as those involving firearms and knives. The unit also provides a specialist firearms officer capability for hostage rescue and close protection.
 Dog Unit: Collaborated unit providing a 24/7 police dog service for tracking, searching and public order duties. The unit also provides pre-planned capabilities for explosive and drugs search.
 Road Policing Unit: Collaborated unit, primarily patrol and respond to serious incidents on the motorway and other road networks. Other duties include responsibilities for taking over pursuits, traffic management and road death investigation.
 Major Crime Unit: Collaborated unit, responsible for the investigation of murder, stranger rape and kidnap, amongst others.

Operational Support
 Force Communications Room (FCR): Responsible for taking emergency and non-emergency calls and recording crime through call handling and the deployment and management of resources through Despatch and Control. The FCR receives an average of 3,000 calls and deals with over 1,000 incidents every day.

Notable incidents and investigations
Notable major incidents and investigations in which Hertfordshire Constabulary have directed or been involved include:
 October 2000: Hatfield rail crash: A railway accident that caused four deaths and over 70 injuries. The accident exposed major stewardship shortcomings and regulatory oversight failings of Railtrack and ultimately triggered its partial re-nationalisation.
 May 2002: Potters Bar Railway Crash: A railway accident that occurred when a train derailed at high speed, killing seven and injuring 76. Part of the train ended up wedged between the station platforms and building structures.
 December 2005: The Buncefield fire: A major fire caused by a series of explosions at the Buncefield oil storage facility causing 45 injuries. It was the largest peacetime explosion since the Second World War and the plume of smoke could be seen from space.
 March 2009: Murder of Jeffrey Howe: Also known as the Jigsaw Murder.
 July 2011: Typing error causes false accusation of paedophilia: In April 2014, Hertfordshire Constabulary acknowledged that three years before while investigating distribution of more than 100 indecent images of children their mistyping of an IP address had led to arrest and charges against the wrong person, the male partner of a woman to whom the mistyped IP address happened to be allocated. In October 2016, Hertfordshire Constabulary settled out of court paying damages and legal costs.
 May 2012: Rothamsted Research protests: Approximately 200 protesters attempted to occupy an agricultural research centre that was conducting tests on genetically modified wheat.
 July–August 2012: 2012 Summer Olympics: The Lee Valley White Water Centre, in Waltham Cross hosted the canoe slalom events of the 2012 Summer Olympics. Hertfordshire Constabulary deployed significant resources in support of the security of the White Water Centre, and supplied officers on mutual aid to the locations in London.
 June 2013: Bilderberg meeting: Hertfordshire Constabulary deployed large numbers of resources, including officers from other forces on mutual aid, in an operation around the Bilderberg Group meeting at The Grove Hotel, Watford.

March and November 2021: Armed police raided wrong addresses on two separate operations.

See also
 Law enforcement in the United Kingdom
 List of law enforcement agencies in the United Kingdom
 Table of police forces in the United Kingdom
 Hertfordshire Police and Crime Commissioner

References

External links

 
 Hertfordshire Constabulary at HMICFRS

Organisations based in Hertfordshire
Police forces of England
1841 establishments in England
Government agencies established in 1841